Cnemaspis gemunu is a species of diurnal gecko endemic to island of Sri Lanka.

References

 http://reptile-database.reptarium.cz/species?genus=Cnemaspis&species=gemunu
 http://www.srisalike.com/Founa/Reptiles/Endemic/Cnemaspis%20gemunu.aspx
 https://web.archive.org/web/20141004183323/http://www.srilankanreptiles.com/TetrapodReptiles/Gekkonidae.html
 https://web.archive.org/web/20140714231021/http://www.vanwisse.nl/srilanka/fauna/Gecko-Cnemaspis-Gemunu

gemunu
Reptiles of Sri Lanka
Reptiles described in 2007